Tonna is a municipality in the district of Gotha, in Thuringia, Germany.

People 
 Georg Hirth (1841-1916), German art collector, journalist and writer

References

Gotha (district)
Saxe-Coburg and Gotha